Tomás Graves (born 27 January 1953, Palma de Mallorca, Spain) is a graphic designer, printer, musician and writer. He is the son of the poet Robert Graves and Beryl Graves (née Pritchard).

Biography
In 1964, he began at Bedales boarding school in England. In 1972, he began studying typographic design at the London College of Printing. In 1975, he returned to Majorca and began working as a designer, photographer and musician. In 1979, he travelled to Nicaragua for six months to observe and document the Sandinista revolution in recordings and photographs, and playing with the Teatro Popular Sandinista.

He joined the Mallorcan band, Pa Amb Oli (Bread and Olive Oil) in 1980. The same year, he met his future wife, Carmen. In 1983, Graves and Carmen established the New Seizin Press in Deià, producing entirely hand-made books until 2000. Their daughter, Rocío, was born in 1987, and Tomás and Carmen married in 1996.

He began writing and translating in 1996. His first translation was of Guy de Forestier's Beloved Majorcans into English, followed by his own work in Spanish, Un hogar en Mallorca (A Home in Majorca). Volem pa amb oli was translated as Bread and Oil and has also appeared in Dutch  (Brood en olie). His first book written in English was Tuning Up at Dawn.

Books
A Home in Majorca: Graves' first book, co-written with Pere Joan and published in Spain, is a handbook for people who have settled in rural Majorca. It covers all aspects of Mediterranean life including traditional architecture, rights of way, flora and fauna, water management and village politics.
Bread and Oil, a collection of recipes and insights centred on the bread and oil that form the staple ingredients of the Majorcan diet. The book concerns not just food but also social history and culture.
Tuning Up at Dawn combines Graves' reminiscences of growing up with his father and family in Majorca and England, his career as a musician and printer, Spanish culture and politics and his affection for Spain and particularly Majorca. Tuning Up at Dawn was a BBC Radio 4 Book of the Week in 2005.

Published works
 Tuning up at Dawn: A Memoir of Music and Majorca (2004); 
 Bread and Oil: Majorcan Culture's Last Stand (2006);  
With Pere Joan
 A Home in Majorca (1998)
Contributions to:
 Time Out Guide to Mallorca & Menorca
 Rough Guide to the Balearics

References

1953 births
Living people
Spanish male writers
Spanish people of English descent
People educated at Bedales School
People from Palma de Mallorca
Spanish typographers and type designers
Musicians from the Balearic Islands
Painters from the Balearic Islands
Graves family
Alumni of the London College of Printing